God the Sustainer is the conception of God who sustains and upholds everything in existence.

Al Qayyum, sometimes rendered "The Sustainer" is one of the 99 Names of God in Islam.
"Creater, Sustainer, Redeemer" is reportedly a "common phrase" in Protestantism in the United States, specifically in Baptist liturgy.

Christian theology
In the Christian theology, the described doctrine is supported by the following biblical and Deuterocanonical references:

Wisdom 11:21-26: For you love all things that exist, and detest none of the things that you have made; for you would not have made anything if you had hated it. How would anything have endured, if you had not willed it? Or how would anything not called forth by you have been preserved? You spare all things, for they are yours, O Lord, you who love the living.
John 5:17: My Father is always at his work, even to this very day; and I am also working.
Acts 17:28: "For in him we live and move and have our being." As some of your own poets have said, "We are his offspring."
Hebrews 1:3: He upholds all things by the word of his power.
Colossians 1:17: He is before all things, and in Him all things hold together.

Moreover, there are other relevant places in the doctrinal Christian literature, for example:

St. Augustine comments on John 5:17: Let us therefore believe that God works constantly, so that all created things would perish, if his working were withdrawn.
The Catechism of the Catholic Church says in 301: With creation, God does not abandon his creatures to themselves. He not only gives them being and existence, but also, and at every moment, upholds and sustains them in being, enables them to act and brings them to their final end. Recognizing this utter dependence with respect to the Creator is a source of wisdom and freedom, of joy and confidence:

Hinduism

The conception of Deity in a sustaining/conserving/preserving mode is also used in Hindu theology where the Godhead, or Trimūrti in Sanskrit, consists of Brahma the Creator, Vishnu the Preserver/Sustainer, and Siva the Destroyer.

Pantheism and pandeism
In pantheism and pandeism (pantheistic deism) generally, God or some similar formulation is characterized as only needing to exist as a sustaining force, with no other aspect.

References

Sustainer